Stephen Minot (May 27, 1927 – December 1, 2010) was an American novelist and short story author.

Born in Boston, Massachusetts, Minot graduated from Harvard College in 1951.  He taught creative writing at several colleges, including Bowdoin College, Trinity College, and the University of California, Riverside.

His novels have been reviewed by many prominent publications, including the New York Times.

In addition to his fiction, he is the author of two textbooks, including Three Genres, the Writing of Poetry, Fiction, and Drama, which is often on creative writing curricula.

In 1966, Minot ran for the US Congress in Connecticut's 6th congressional district as a third-party candidate in opposition to the Vietnam War.  He garnered 5,731 votes, or 3.4% of the vote.

Bibliography

Novels
Chill of Dusk (1964)
Ghost Images (1979)
Surviving the Flood (1981)

Short Story Collections
Crossings, Stories by Stephen Minot (1975)
Bending Time (1997)

Nonfiction
Three Genres, the Writing of Poetry, Fiction, and Drama (1st edition 1965; 8th edition 2007)
Three Stances of Modern Fiction (anthology edited with Robley Wilson, Jr., 1972)
Reading Fiction (1984)
Literary Nonfiction: The Fourth Genre (2002)

References

1927 births
20th-century American novelists
American male novelists
Harvard College alumni
Bowdoin College faculty
University of California, Riverside faculty
2010 deaths
20th-century American male writers
Novelists from Maine